The Medal "For Merit in Space Exploration" is a state decoration of the Russian Federation aimed at recognising achievements in the space program. It was established by presidential decree №1099 of September 7, 2010 which revamped the entire Russian awards system.

Award statute
The Medal "For Merit in Space Exploration" is awarded to citizens of the Russian Federation for achievements in research, development and utilization of outer space, for a substantial contribution to the development of rocket and space technology and industry, training, research and design activities, for the implementation of international programs, as well as for other achievements in the field of space activities aimed at the comprehensive socio-economic development of the Russian Federation, at strengthening its defense and ensuring national interests, for encouraging and increasing international cooperation.

The Medal "For Merit in Space Exploration" may be awarded to foreign citizens for outstanding achievements in the development of space technology in the Russian Federation.

The Russian Federation Order of Precedence dictates the Medal "For Merit in Space Exploration" is to be worn on the left breast with other medals immediately after the Medal "For Merit in the Development of Nuclear Energy".

Award description
The Medal "For Merit in Space Exploration" is a 32mm diameter circular silver medal with a raised rim on both the obverse and reverse. The obverse of the medal bears an R-7 rocket launching from its pad, two supporting towers leaning at an angle away from the rocket, to the left of the rocket, a large four pointed star, to the right of the rocket, two smaller four pointed stars. The reverse of the medal bears the inscription "FOR MERIT IN SPACE EXPLORATION". Below the inscription, a relief letter "N" with an horizontal line reserved for the award serial number.

The medal is secured to a standard Russian pentagonal mount by a ring through the medal suspension loop. The mount is covered by an overlapping 24mm wide silk moiré light blue ribbon with a 5mm dark blue central stripe, two white 2mm edge stripes and two 2mm white stripes separating the dark from the light blue.

Award recipients

The following individuals are recipients of the Medal "For Merit in Space Exploration":

See also

 Awards and decorations of the Russian Federation
 Russian Federal Space Agency

References

External links
 The Commission on State Awards to the President of the Russian Federation

Military awards and decorations of Russia
Civil awards and decorations of Russia
Russian awards
Awards established in 2010